Lucille Silvia Derbez Amézquita, better known as Silvia Derbez (March 8, 1932 – April 6, 2002) was a Mexican film and television actress. She competed in Miss Mexico 1952 where she came in 4th place.

Life and career
Derbez was born in San Luis Potosí, Mexico, the daughter of María de la Luz Amézquita and French-born businessman Marcel Derbez Gilly. She debuted in Mexican film as a teenager, participating in her first movie at the age of 15, when she acted in La Novia del Mar (Girlfriend of the Sea), filmed in 1947.

In 1948, she participated in a classic of Mexican cinema: Allá en el Rancho Grande (Out on the Big Ranch). She was in three more movies before the decade of the 1940s had ended, including the classic cabaretera film noir Salón México.

Derbez became a celebrity, both nationally and internationally, during the 1950s, an era in which she recorded sixteen films. Between 1951 and 1954, Derbez retired from filming, but she was in ten movies from 1954 to 1956.

With television becoming popular in Mexico, Derbez was signed by Televisa to play "Nora" in the 1958 soap opera, Senda prohibida (Forbidden Way). In 1959, Derbez got the title role in another soap opera, Elisa.

Derbez acted in seventeen telenovelas during the 1960s, many of them in which she starred. Among the soap operas she made during that decade was Maria Isabel I, where she once again played the title role. She returned to cinema in 1969, participating in three movies between then and 1970.

During the 1970s, her work rate on television slowed slightly. She made twelve telenovelas during that time. Among the telenovelas that she participated in was 1970's Angelitos negros (Black Angels), as a nanny. She also acted in 1971's El derecho de los hijos (Your Children's Rights) and La Recogida (which loosely translates to The Picked up Woman). In 1975, she acted in a movie, El Andariego (The Walker).

As Derbez began to age, her work rate numbers began to decline, and during the 1980s, she acted in only six telenovelas and four movies. In 1986, her husband, Eugenio González Salas, a publicist, died. Nevertheless, Derbez recovered from that personal loss and participated in one of Latin America's most famed telenovelas of all time, Simplemente Maria, in 1989. In Simplemente Maria, Derbez acted alongside Victoria Ruffo, who would soon become her daughter in law. Simplemente Maria'''s 1989 version was popular in countries such as Puerto Rico and Venezuela. During the 1990s, Derbez's son Eugenio Derbez became famous as a television comedian. He and Ruffo got married.

Derbez made three movies during the early 1990s, including 1993's Zapatos Viejos (Old Shoes), where she acted alongside singer Gloria Trevi. In 1994, Derbez was in Prisionera de Amor (Prisoner of Love), and in 1995, she played "Milagros" in Lazos de Amor. Those two soap operas became popular among Hispanic viewers in the United States.

Derbez once again returned to cinema acting after Prisionera de Amor and Lazos de Amor, acting in three movies before returning to television as "Leonor" in Los hijos de nadie (Nobody's Children). In 1998, she participated in another highly acclaimed Mexican telenovela, La usurpadora (The supplanter), which starred Gabriela Spanic. Her last work as an actress came in 2001's version of Caridad Bravo Adams' La intrusa (The Intruder'').

Death 
On April 6, 2002, aged 70, from lung cancer.

Family 
She had one son, Eugenio, and a daughter, Silvia Eugenia. Her granddaughter, Aislinn Derbez, is an actress. Two other grandchildren, Vadhir Derbez and José Eduardo Derbez, are actors as well.

Filmography

External links
Silvia Derbez at the Telenovela database

1932 births
2002 deaths
Mexican people of French descent
Mexican film actresses
Mexican stage actresses
Mexican television actresses
Mexican telenovela actresses
People from San Luis Potosí
20th-century Mexican actresses
Deaths from lung cancer in Mexico